Give someone enough rope, and they will hang themselves is a proverb or idiomatic expression meaning that given the opportunity, people will incriminate themselves.

Give someone enough rope or enough rope may also refer to:

Give 'Em Enough Rope, a 1978 album by English punk group the Clash
Enough Rope, a 2003 to 2008 Australian TV interview series
Enough Rope (film), a 1963 film
Enough Rope, Dorothy Parker's first collection of poetry in 1926

See also
Not Enough Rope